The first World Greco-Roman Wrestling Championship was organized on May 23, 1904, in Vienna, Cisleithania, Austria-Hungary, just eight years after the first modern Olympics and eight years before the foundation of the International Wrestling Federation of Associated Wrestling Styles. 26 wrestlers from Austria, Denmark, Germany, Bohemia and Hungary participated in the event.

Medal table

Medal summary

Men's Greco-Roman

Participating nations
26 competitors from 5 nations participated.

 (19)
 (1)
 (3)
 (2)
 (1)

References
UWW Database

World Wrestling Championships
W
W
W